Ibrahim Isaac Sidrak (born 19 August 1955 in Beni-Chokeir, Egypt) is the current Coptic Catholic Patriarch of Alexandria.

Life
Ibrahim Isaac Sidrak was born on 19 August 1955 in Beni-Chokeir, Asyut Governorate. He studied philosophy and theology at St. Leo's Patriarchal Seminary in Maadi (a suburb of Cairo) and was ordained a priest in 1980. For the following two years he served in the Parish of Archangel Michael in Cairo. He was sent to Rome to study at the Pontifical Gregorian University and received his doctorate in dogmatic theology. Between 1990 and 2001 he was the rector of the Patriarchal Seminary in Maadi. For a short period in 2002 he served as the parish priest of the patriarchal Cathedral of Our Lady of Egypt, in Cairo. In October 2002, he was elected Bishop of Minya, a post in which he served until his canonical election as patriarch.

Ibrahim Isaac Sidrak was elected as Coptic Catholic Patriarch of Alexandria by the synod of the Coptic Catholic Church on 15 January 2013, in succession of Patriarch Antonios I Naguib who had resigned because of poor health (he had a stroke, suffered partial paralysis and underwent brain surgery). Patriarch Sidrak asked for and received ecclesiastical communion from Pope Benedict XVI three days later, on 18 January 2013.

Ibrahim Isaac Sidrak often works closely with Pope Francis and the Coptic Orthodox Pope, Tawadros II, with the goal and aim of unifying the Coptic Orthodox and Coptic Catholic churches of Egypt.

References

Sources
Rinuncia del Patriarca di Alessandria dei Copti (Egitto) ed Elezione del Nuovo Patriarca, Holy See Press Office

External Links

,http://www.catholic-hierarchy.org/bishop/bsidrak.html

 

20th-century Eastern Catholic clergy
21st-century Eastern Catholic bishops
Living people
1955 births
Coptic Catholic Patriarchs of Alexandria
Pontifical Gregorian University alumni
People from Asyut Governorate
Members of the Congregation for the Oriental Churches